Nepenthes kongkandana is a tropical pitcher plant endemic to Songkhla Province in southern Thailand. It is closely related to N. kerrii.

Natural hybrids
N. kongkandana × N. mirabilis

References

External links
Nepenthes of Indochina

Carnivorous plants of Asia
kongkandana
Endemic flora of Thailand
Plants described in 2015